Comesperma scoparium, commonly known as broom milkwort, is a small broom-like shrub of the family Polygalaceae.  It usually grows to between 0.3 and 1.2 metres high  and produces blue flowers between February and November in its native range.

The species was first formally described by James Drummond in The Journal of Botany in 1840 and given the name Comesperma scoparia, which was later amended to the current name.

The species occurs in the states of  Western Australia, South Australia, and Victoria in Australia.

Gallery

References

scoparium
Flora of South Australia
Flora of Victoria (Australia)
Flora of Western Australia
Plants described in 1840
Taxa named by James Drummond (botanist)